Damias albata is a moth of the family Erebidae first described by Karl Jordan in 1905. It is found in New Guinea.

References

Damias
Moths described in 1905